1989 saw many sequels and prequels in video games, such as Phantasy Star II, Super Mario Land, Super Monaco GP, along with new titles such as Big Run, Bonk's Adventure, Final Fight, Golden Axe, Strider, Hard Drivin' and Teenage Mutant Ninja Turtles. The year also saw the release of the Sega Genesis and TurboGrafx-16 in North America, and the Game Boy worldwide along with Tetris and Super Mario Land.

The year's highest-grossing arcade games in Japan were Namco's  Final Lap and Sega's Tetris, while the highest-grossing arcade video games in the United States were Double Dragon, Super Off Road and Hard Drivin' among dedicated arcade cabinets and Capcom Bowling and Ninja Gaiden among arcade conversion kits. The year's bestselling home system was the Nintendo Entertainment System (Famicom) for the sixth year in a row, while the year's best-selling home video games were Super Mario Bros. 3 in Japan and RoboCop in the United Kingdom.

Financial performance

Highest-grossing arcade games

Japan
In Japan, the following titles were the highest-grossing arcade games of 1989.

Hong Kong and United Kingdom
In Hong Kong and the United Kingdom, the following titles were the top-grossing arcade games of each month.

United States 
In the United States, the following titles were the highest-grossing arcade games of 1989.

Best-selling home systems

Best-selling home video games

Japan
The following titles were the top ten best-selling home video games of 1989 in Japan, according to the annual Family Computer Magazine (Famimaga) charts.

United Kingdom
In the United Kingdom, RoboCop for the ZX Spectrum was the best-selling home video game of 1989. The following titles were the best-selling home video games of each month in the United Kingdom during 1989.

United States
In the United States, the following titles were the best-selling home video games of each month in 1989.

Top-rated games

Major awards

Japan and United Kingdom

United States

Critically acclaimed titles

Famitsu and CVG reviews
In Japan, the following 1989 video game releases entered Famitsu magazine's "Platinum Hall of Fame" for receiving Famitsu scores of at least 35 out of 40.

In the United Kingdom, the following titles were Computer and Video Games (CVG) magazine's highest-rated games of 1989.

English-language reviews
Notable video game releases in 1989 that have accumulated overall critical acclaim from at least four contemporary English-language sources include:

Events

 The Consumer Electronics Show (CES) is held at the Las Vegas Convention Center on January 7–10. Nintendo announces that it would release 40 new NES titles through its licensees in 1989, while Sega announces 20 titles that include several translations of arcade games. Peripherals unveiled and demonstrated at this event include Broderbund's U-Force, Beeshu's Zoomer, and Nintendo's Power Pad. The next CES is held in Chicago in June.
 CSG Imagesoft and Sony hold regional Super Dodge Ball contests in Los Angeles (July 15–16 and 29–30), Chicago (August 5–6), New York City (September 9–10 and 16–17), Boston (September 23–24), and Seattle (October 14–15). Finalists from each region enter the "Super Dodge Ball World Cup" in Seattle on October 27–28, where the winners receive an assortment of Sony products as prizes.
 In August, Capcom donates $50,000 worth of video game equipment and Capcom titles to pediatric wards of California hospitals.
 Sega of America ends its Master System distribution deal with Tonka, and appoints former Atari Corporation President Michael Katz as its new president in October.
 Konami launches the "Crumble Competition", in which participants win a free Konami title from rub-off cards found in specially marked packages of Chips Ahoy! and Oreo cookies. Konami also collaborates with Ralston Purina to create a breakfast cereal based on the Teenage Mutant Ninja Turtles.
 On October 3, Nintendo and Fidelity Investments announce plans to jointly develop a home trading system for financial services.
 NEC promotes the TurboGrafx-16 with contests held at local shopping centers in Los Angeles (October 6–8), Trumbull, Connecticut (October 21–22), Chicago (October 27–31), Wayne, New Jersey (November 11–12), Marlborough, Massachusetts (November 18–19) and Atlanta (December 2–3). The Los Angeles contest is won by 17-year-old Jim Hakola of Lakewood, California, who scored 220,080 points on Blazing Lazers.
 Corey Sandler and Tom Badgett's Ultimate Unauthorized Nintendo Game Strategies, the first in Bantam Books' "Game Mastery" series, is released in November.
 PepsiCo awards over 4,000 Game Boy systems via an under-the-cap contest across a variety of Pepsi soft drinks.
 The Galaxy of Electronic Games show, produced by Pinnacle Productions, opens at the San Jose Convention Center in November 17–19. The show features a display of more than 300 computer and video games and a 2,500 square foot area of arcade games.
 On December 2, the world premiere of the Universal Pictures film The Wizard is held at the Cineplex Odeon Theatre in Universal City, California. The film – starring Fred Savage, Luke Edwards, Jenny Lewis, Christian Slater and Beau Bridges – tells the story of two brothers who travel to a video game tournament.

Hardware releases
 August 29 – NEC's PC-Engine released in North America as the TurboGrafx-16.
 October 11 – Atari Corporation releases the Lynx handheld console with color and backlighting.
 October 14 – The Mega Drive is released in North America as the Sega Genesis.
 Nintendo releases the Game Boy handheld console.
 Mattel releases the Power Glove controller for the NES home console.

Game releases
 February – Atari Games releases the Hard Drivin' arcade game, with filled polygon 3D graphics, physics simulation, and a force-feedback steering wheel.
 March 21 – Sega releases Phantasy Star II, a landmark title for the role-playing video game genre.
 April 21 – Nintendo releases Super Mario Land on the Game Boy, introducing Princess Daisy to the Mario series.
 May – Sega releases Golden Axe, the first game in the Golden Axe series.
 May 12 – Konami releases Teenage Mutant Ninja Turtles for NES, one of the first video games based on the 1987 Teenage Mutant Ninja Turtles animated series, being released after the show's second season.
 June 5 – Bullfrog releases Populous, one of the first commercially successful god games.
 June – Lucasfilm Games releases puzzle game Pipe Mania, which lives on in other titles as a visual representation of computer or security system hacking.
 July 11 – Capcom releases Mega Man 2 in more countries (US).
 July 27 – Nintendo releases Mother in Japan, the first of a trilogy of role-playing games produced by celebrity writer Shigesato Itoi.
 August – Nintendo of America introduces Enix's Dragon Warrior franchise to North America.
 August 26 – Nintendo releases the Zelda Game & Watch.
 September – Atari Games releases S.T.U.N. Runner in arcades, a 3D polygonal vehicle combat/racing game.
 September 14 – Capcom releases DuckTales for NES based on the Disney animated TV series of the same name.
 October 3 – Brøderbund releases Prince of Persia for the declining Apple II, having been in development since 1985. Ports to other systems turn the game into a hit.
 October 3 – Maxis releases Will Wright's SimCity, the first of the "Sim" games and a revolutionary real-time software toy.
 December 6 – Strategic Studies Group releases Warlords which was one of the first fantasy turn-based strategy game.
 December 15 – Hudson Soft releases Bonk's Adventure, introducing the TurboGrafx-16 mascot and starting the Bonk franchise.
 December 15 - Tecmo releases Bad News Baseball in Japan. US release to follow in January 1990.
 December 15 – Techno Soft releases Herzog Zwei for the Mega Drive in Japan, laying the foundations for the real-time strategy genre.
 December 22 – Konami releases Castlevania III: Dracula's Curse, the third and final game from series for NES.
 Tengen releases an unlicensed version of the Tetris video game, which is recalled after Nintendo sues Tengen.
 Wes Cherry writes Solitaire and Robert Donner writes Minesweeper, which are bundled with Microsoft Windows starting from version 3.
Psygnosis releases a platformer Shadow of the Beast, demonstrating the capabilities of the Amiga and helping sales of the computer.
Sega releases Wonder Boy III: The Dragon's Trap.
Spectrum Holobyte's Vette! for PC and Macintosh features a 3D flat-shaded rendition of San Francisco.
Three-Sixty Pacific releases computer wargame Harpoon.
Atari Corporation supports the aging Atari 2600 with a new batch of cartridges, including Secret Quest.

Business
 Hasbro, Inc. acquires elements of Coleco Industries, Inc.
 Trinity Acquisition Corporation founded (renamed THQ in 1990)
 Nintendo withdraws from the Japan Amusement Machinery Manufacturers Association (JAMMA) on February 28. 
 Nintendo of America, Inc. v. Tengen:
 Nintendo sues Tengen over the Tetris video game copyrights. Tengen loses and recalls all its Tetris games.
 In November, Nintendo sues Tengen over production of unlicensed Nintendo games. Tengen loses. (Tengen originally sued Nintendo on December 12, 1988, for antitrust violations.)
 Nintendo v. Camerica Ltd. Nintendo sues Camerica over patent violations of the Game Genie for the NES console. Camerica wins the suit.
 UK publisher Martech goes out of business.

See also
1989 in games

References

 
 
Video games by year
video games